Charles M. Clinger (born December 28, 1976, in Jackson Hole, Wyoming) is a retired American high jumper.

He won the bronze medal at the 1999 Pan American Games.

Personal life
Clinger graduated from Star Valley High School (Afton, Wyoming) in 1995. He attended Boise State University, leaving in 1996 for two years as an LDS Missionary in Brisbane, Australia. Clinger returned to the United States in 1998 and attended Weber State University, graduating in 2001. He later graduated from the UC Davis School of Law and is currently an attorney in Star Valley, Wyoming.

References

 

1976 births
Living people
American male high jumpers
People from Jackson, Wyoming
Weber State University alumni
UC Davis School of Law alumni
Pan American Games bronze medalists for the United States
Pan American Games medalists in athletics (track and field)
Athletes (track and field) at the 1999 Pan American Games
Medalists at the 1999 Pan American Games